Simon Douglas (1843–1950) was a former slave who lived to become the last American Civil War soldier in the state of New Jersey.

Douglas was born on January 25, 1843, as a slave on a plantation in Fairfield County, South Carolina. In 1862, during the US Civil War, he went to the front lines as a body servant for his masters' son, in the Confederate Army. Douglas became free by 1864 and moved north as a blacksmith and bummer (a nickname for foragers) of Maj. Gen. William Tecumseh Sherman of the Union Army.

In 1866, Douglas settled in what was to become Fairview, Bergen County, New Jersey. He married a local resident, with whom he had a son and daughter. He ran his own blacksmithing business into his 90s. He lived there until he died on March 8, 1950.

He is interred in Hackensack Cemetery (#4738, Sec 16, Row 12).

References

External links

1843 births
1950 deaths
People from Fairfield County, South Carolina
People from Fairview, New Jersey
People of New Jersey in the American Civil War
People of South Carolina in the American Civil War
19th-century American slaves
African-American centenarians
American centenarians
Men centenarians
Burials in New Jersey
20th-century African-American people
African-American history of New Jersey